WildWorks (formerly Smart Bomb Interactive) is an American game development studio based in Salt Lake City, Utah. The studio was assembled from game industry veterans, co-founded by Kris Johnson, Clark Stacey, and Jeff Amis. The studio has developed titles for all ages across many platforms, including home consoles, PCs and handheld devices.

As of August 30, 2022, Indian based diversified gaming and sports media platform Nazara Technologies acquired WildWorks for 10.4 million USD.

Games

Animal Jam (Formerly "Animal Jam: Play Wild!") 
In December 2014, WildWorks released a 3D mobile app version of Animal Jam Classic called Animal Jam (formerly "Animal Jam: Play Wild" before April 2020). In 2016, it was announced that Animal Jam received over one million downloads despite having no paid user acquisition. Animal Jam has been the number one downloaded iPad game for kids 9–11 in 35 countries, the number one downloaded iPad educational game in 20 countries, and the number one top-grossing iPad game for kids 9–11 in 54 countries. As of late 2020, Animal Jam and Animal Jam Classic had 3.3 million monthly active users and a lifetime total of 130 million registered players in 200 countries.

Animal Jam Classic (Formerly "Animal Jam") 
The studio's flagship title was Animal Jam Classic (formerly "Animal Jam" before April 2020). Animal Jam Classic is a virtual world for children, being developed within a partnership with the National Geographic Society. Users are placed in an online world called Jamaa, and are presented with a number of games, spaces to interract with other players, and light edutainment features in the form of games and fun facts within the gameworld. The game offers additional interactive educational resources for children, teachers and parents. In early 2016, Animal Jam Classic was named the fastest growing game site in the US with over 50 million users registered worldwide.

Fer.al 
On April the 24th of 2019, WildWorks announced Feral at UDEN #22 (stylized as "Fer.al"), a MMO game based around fantasy and myth, unlike Animal Jam Classic and Animal Jam, Feral was going to be directed at a 13+ audience as stated at UDEN. Feral was in Closed Beta from December the 11th, 2019 until May the 20th, 2020. It went into Early Access from May the 20th but never reached full release.

On February the 17th of 2022, wwadmin, the administrative account of WildWorks in the Feral Discord server, announced they were shutting down the game. The game was to reopen on February the 19th for 24 hours, but due to violation of Feral's Terms of Service, the reopening was pushed to March the 26th and shortened to 3 hours. Feral formally ceased operations on March the 26th after a 3-hour shutdown period.

Cinder 
Cinder is a 2021 Solana-Based NFT MMO game, created using the engine and assets of the now-defunct WildWorks title Fer.al. The game is populated with avatars referred to as the Cinder Fae, whose traits are procedurally generated for sale as NFT character tokens. At launch, the initial mint contained 4,444 Cinder Fae NFTs for sale on the Solana marketplace. According to the Cinder white paper, the Wildworks team began beta testing in April 2020. At some point, the part of Wildworks creating Cinder branched off and formed Cinder Studios.

On February 8 2023, Cinder’s servers suddenly shut down without warning, along with its website. An employee reported that Cinder Studios was shut down. There have been no official announcements about Cinder’s shutdown.

List of Titles 
Snoopy vs. the Red Baron
Snoopy Flying Ace
Animal Jam Classic (Formally known as "Animal Jam")
Tunnel Town
Animal Jam Jump
Pac-Man World Rally
Bee Movie Game
Dash Tag
Tag with Ryan
Feral (stylized as "Fer.al")
Cinder

Technology

Bombshell 
The studio also developed Bombshell, an engine and toolset for the development of high-fidelity interactive entertainment. The studio previously received first-round funding from the Canopy Group.

References

External links

Cinder.io
Animal Jam

Companies based in Salt Lake City
Video game companies of the United States
Video game development companies
2022 mergers and acquisitions